State is a semantic web platform created by London, UK-based Equal Media Ltd. Announced in 2013, and launched in 2014, State aims to build a global opinion network using natural language processing, databases and sentiment analysis. It seeks to "democratiz[e] online conversations" by giving equal representation of each person's opinion. As of 2020, the site is inactive.

History
Equal Media was founded by Jawbone founder Alex Asseily and his brother Mark Asseily, who raised $14 million in seed financing in May 2012 from funders such as Atomico.

State launched in closed alpha in May 2013 with around 10,000 users and at TechCrunch Disrupt in September 2013 it launched an invite-only beta release. When State launched its mobile app and the platform to the public in February 2014, it had about 30 employees, most of whom work at headquarters in London. It also has an office in San Francisco.

Its advisors include Sir Tim Berners-Lee, Deepak Chopra, Troy Carter, Eli Pariser, Andrew Paulson, and Nigel Shadbolt.

Features
State has a large dictionary of "headlines", or structured expressions organized semantically. This allows users to opine more specifically, as Asseily explained: "The world isn’t as thumbs-up/thumbs-down as we may have imagined. They are adding texture to their opinions." Furthermore, users can “tune”—i.e., follow— in to specific topics such as politics or technology, and can also import friends from Facebook, Google Plus, and Twitter. Because opinions are computer-readable, they can automatically be summarized and cross-referenced.

Re/code writer Liz Gannes described it as an "interest graph" startup.

Business model
Asseily envisions State "eventually becom[ing] a research-on-demand service" with a "database that brands can access". For example, "insights reports" based on aggregated opinions could "aim to capture sentiment about a concept, brand, or event, which are currently free for State users".

Examples of such insights include the following. State users generally viewed "Facebook as a whole" negatively while opinions of the company's new Paper app were overwhelmingly positive. Regarding the surveillance disclosures by Edward Snowden, some people held conflicted opinions towards Edward Snowden and the Prism programme. As Asseily explained, "In general terms, some people who thought Snowden was a villain, also thought Prism was bad and likewise, some thought Snowden was a hero but that Prism was a good thing".

References

Semantic Web companies
Technology companies based in London
Internet properties established in 2013
Technology companies established in 2013
British social networking websites